The HTC Desire V is an Android ICS-based dual-SIM smartphone manufactured by HTC. It supports tri-band GSM on its secondary slot and quad-band GSM/EDGE + dual-band HSPA on the primary SIM-1 slot. It is available in two color options: Black and White. It has specifications that were considered mid-range by reviewers around the time of release. Reviewers also highlighted the rarity of dual-SIM phones during that time.

References

Desire C
Android (operating system) devices
Mobile phones introduced in 2012
Discontinued smartphones